During the 2005–06 season, CA Osasuna competed in La Liga, the top division of Spanish football, as well as the Copa del Rey and UEFA Cup.

Season summary
The culmination of a consolidated CA Osasuna in the elite of football came the 2005-06 season. It was Javier Aguirre’s fourth consecutive year as the manager and CA Osasuna had just returned to European competition the previous year on the 2005–06 La Liga. The 2005–06 La Liga CA Osasuna season was a historic season for the club. After 38 league games, the team managed to finished 4th in La Liga only falling behind F.C. Barcelona, Real Madrid and Valencia. For the second time in its history, CA Osasuna finished 4th in the Spanish first division league, obtaining the qualification for the first time in the club history to the UEFA Champions League. They would end up falling against Hamburger SV on the previous qualification to the Champions League 2006-07, drawing both leg-games but losing the qualification. Automatically CA Osasuna dropped and played the UEFA Europa League on the 2006-07 season. The 2005–06 La Liga season was the season that CA Osasuna recorded the most points on a single season in its history. Also, they were able to finished 2nd in the league before Christmas break with 36 points, finishing on top of Real Madrid and Valencia and only falling behind F.C Barcelona.  Javier Aguirre would end up leaving the following season to manage Atletico de Madrid due to the success of the 2005-06 season.  During the season, CA Osasuna stadium name was changed from El Sadar to Reyno de Navarra.

First-team squad
Squad at end of season

Left club during season

Competitions

La Liga

League table

Copa del Rey

UEFA Cup

References

CA Osasuna
CA Osasuna seasons